William Dumond Swart (July 9, 1856 – 1936) was an American merchant, manufacturer and politician from Nashua, New Hampshire.

Swart was born on July 9, 1856 in Margaretville, New York to William R. and Eliza (Drumond) Swart.

On October 7, 1890 Swart married Lizzie A. Roby.  They had two children, Elizabeth Swart and William Roby Swart.

Swart was a thirty-second degree mason.

Swart served as a member and President of the Nashua, New Hampshire Common Council, and in both houses of the New Hampshire legislature as President of the New Hampshire Senate  and as a member of the New Hampshire Executive Council.

Notes

External links 
 William D. Swart in Publications - Portraits of Legislators On State House Third Floor

1856 births
1936 deaths
Members of the Executive Council of New Hampshire
Republican Party New Hampshire state senators
Presidents of the New Hampshire Senate
Republican Party members of the New Hampshire House of Representatives